Günther Sabetzki (4 June 1915 in Düsseldorf, German Empire – 21 June 2000) was an executive for several ice hockey leagues and organizations.

Sabetzki was one of the founding members of the German Ice Hockey Federation in 1963.  He would become the organization's first co-president along with Ludwig Zametzer.  In 1966 he was elected as a member of the International Ice Hockey Federation, an organization he would lead as president, from 1975 to 1994.  While president of the IIHF, he was instrumental in bridging the gap between European and North American hockey powers, and helped bring Hockey Canada back into the Olympic fold in 1980. In 1982, Sabetzki formed the first German women’s hockey league. It was formed in North Rhine-Westphalia. During his tenure as IIHF president, membership in the IIHF rose from 31 countries to 50. He was also responsible for overseeing the punishments following the Punch-up in Piestany.

Awards and honors
Sabetzki was elected to the Hockey Hall of Fame in 1995.

References

External links
 

1915 births
2000 deaths
Commanders Crosses of the Order of Merit of the Federal Republic of Germany
German ice hockey executives
Hockey Hall of Fame inductees
Recipients of the Olympic Order
Sportspeople from Düsseldorf
International Ice Hockey Federation executives
IIHF Hall of Fame inductees